Serpil Midyatli (born 8 August 1975) is a German politician who has been serving as deputy leader of the Social Democratic Party of Germany (SPD), and chairwoman of the SPD in Schleswig-Holstein since 2019. She has been the Leader of the Opposition in Schleswig-Holstein since July 2021.

Political career 
Midyatli joined the Social Democratic Party of Germany in 2000. She was part of the local municipal council in Kiel-Gaarden. Midyatli has been a member of the Landtag of Schleswig-Holstein since the 2009 election.  

Midyatli's political topics of interest include social integration, equality, family policy, and other social issues. She is considered part of the left wing within the Social Democratic Party.

In March 2019 Midyatli became leader of the SPD in Schleswig-Holstein, succeeding Ralf Stegner to be the first woman in the office. On 6 December she was elected as one of five deputy federal chairpersons of her party. Prior to this, she supported Saskia Esken and Norbert Walter-Borjans in the leadership election. Also succeeding Ralf Stegner, Midyatli became chairwoman of the party's parliamentary group in the Landtag of Schleswig-Holstein and thereby leader of the opposition in July 2021.

In the negotiations to form a so-called traffic light coalition of the SPD, the Green Party and the FDP following the 2021 federal elections, Midyatli led her party's delegation in the working group on children, youth and families; her co-chairs from the other parties were Katrin Göring-Eckardt and Stephan Thomae.

Midyatli was nominated by her party as delegate to the Federal Convention for the purpose of electing the President of Germany in 2022.

Other activities 
 Business Forum of the Social Democratic Party of Germany, Member of the Political Advisory Board (since 2020)

Personal life 
Midyatli was born in 1975 in Kiel, where she also grew up. Her parents are Turkish immigrants. She is a Muslim, married, and has two sons.

After graduating from the Realschule in 1992, Midyatli originally planned to study law. Instead she came to lead a restaurant owned by her parents at the age of 18. She later ran a concert hall, a catering company, and founded a cultural event company with her husband.

References

External links 
  
 

1975 births
Politicians from Kiel
German Muslims
German politicians of Turkish descent
Social Democratic Party of Germany politicians
Members of the Landtag of Schleswig-Holstein
Women members of State Parliaments in Germany
Living people